Sparta-Feyenoord is a defunct baseball team in Honkbal Hoofdklasse, the Dutch professional baseball league. Facing relegation after the 2012 season, the club went bankrupt and folded.

2011 roster

References

External links
Official site of Sparta-Feyenoord (Dutch)

Defunct baseball teams in the Netherlands
Defunct sports teams in the Netherlands